Kirayi Rowdylu is a 1981 Telugu-language film directed by A. Kodandarami Reddy. It features Chiranjeevi, Mohan Babu, and Raadhika. The film was a box office success, and it was remade in Hindi as Hoshiyar.

Cast 
 Chiranjeevi as Raja
 Mohan Babu
 Raadhika

References

External links 

1981 films
Films directed by A. Kodandarami Reddy
Films scored by K. Chakravarthy
Telugu films remade in other languages
1980s Telugu-language films